Astraxanovka (also, Astrakhanovka and Novaya Astrakhanovka) is a village and municipality in the Oghuz Rayon of Azerbaijan.  It has a population of 587.  The municipality consists of the villages of Astraxanovka and Vladimirovka.

References 

Populated places in Oghuz District